Providence Road station may refer to:

Providence Road station (SEPTA Route 101), Media, Pennsylvania
Providence Road station (SEPTA Route 102), Alden, Pennsylvania

See also
Providence Road